Louis William "Boze" Berger (May 13, 1910 – November 3, 1992) was an American infielder who played in the Major League Baseball (MLB) during the 1930s, for the Cleveland Indians, Chicago White Sox and Boston Red Sox.

Biography
He was born in Baltimore, Maryland, and was also a two-time All-American forward for the University of Maryland basketball team from 1929 to 1932, where he led the Southern Conference in scoring in 1931 with 19.1 points per game. His #6 jersey has been honored by the university, and he was inducted into the University of Maryland Athletic Hall of Fame in 1982.

In a six-season career, Berger was a .236 hitter with 13 home runs and 97 RBI in 343 games played. 1935 was his best season in baseball, achieving career-highs in hits (119), doubles (27), triples (5), runs (62), RBI (43) and games played (124). 

Berger died in Bethesda, Maryland, at the age of 82.

References

External links

 Retrosheet
 
 UMTerps.com Basketball Media Guide

1910 births
1992 deaths
All-American college men's basketball players
Baseball players from Baltimore
Boston Red Sox players
Burials at Arlington National Cemetery
Chicago White Sox players
Cleveland Indians players
Kansas City Blues (baseball) players
Major League Baseball second basemen
Maryland Terrapins baseball players
Maryland Terrapins football players
Maryland Terrapins men's basketball players
Montreal Royals players
Newark Bears (IL) players
New Orleans Pelicans (baseball) players
People from Bethesda, Maryland
Sacramento Solons players
Seattle Rainiers players
Toledo Mud Hens players
Williamsport Grays players
Players of American football from Maryland
American men's basketball players